Anopyxis klaineana is a species of plant in the Rhizophoraceae family. It is found in Cameroon, the Republic of the Congo, Ivory Coast, Ethiopia, Ghana, Liberia, Nigeria, Sierra Leone, and Sudan.

References

Rhizophoraceae
Vulnerable plants
Taxonomy articles created by Polbot